Jo Kennedy (born 1962) is an Australian actress, singer, film director and screenwriter. 

She is best known for playing Jackie in the 1982 film Starstruck. Even though the film never had a proper US release, it found a cult following on cable television. The film spawned a soundtrack album, which includes the hit single, "Body and Soul", sung by Kennedy. It was written (as "She Got Body She Got Soul") by Tim Finn of Split Enz. The single made number five on the Australian Kent Music Report Singles Chart in May 1982 and was the 44th biggest selling single of 1982.

She won the Silver Bear for Best Actress at the 35th Berlin International Film Festival for her role in the 1985 film Wrong World. 

Kennedy featured in the 1986 television special, The Pack of Women. She appeared on the soundtrack album (and its single "Is That Me?") and was nominated for an ARIA Award for Best Female Artist in 1987. She was nominated for an AFI Award for Best Actress in a Leading Role for the film Tender Hooks in 1988. Kennedy's later roles include the telemovie Waiting at the Royal, for which she was nominated for an AFI Award for Best Performance by an Actress in a Telefeature or Mini Series in 2000.

Discography

Singles

Selected filmography
 Starstruck (1982) (Feature film)
   Countdown (ABC TV series) Co-host with Ned Lander (Starstruck)
   1982 Australian Film Awards (1982) (ABC TV special)
 Wrong World (1984) (Feature film)
   Pokerface (1986) (ABC TV series)
   The Pack of Women (1986) (ABC TV special)
 Tender Hooks (1989) (Feature film)
 Golden Braid (1990) (Feature film)
 The Flying Doctors (TV series) (1991; as Eve Rutherford, recurring guest role)
   Stingers (1998) (TV series) (Guest role)
 Waiting at the Royal (2000) (TV film)

References

External links

1962 births
Living people
Australian film actresses
Australian film directors
Australian screenwriters
Actresses from Melbourne
Silver Bear for Best Actress winners
Australian women film directors
20th-century Australian actresses
21st-century Australian actresses
Australian women screenwriters
Australian women singers